The 2007 Swedish Golf Tour, titled as the 2007 Telia Tour for sponsorship reasons, was the 24th season of the Swedish Golf Tour.

The season was the 12th and last with Telia Company as main sponsor of the tour. It was also the last year the Swedish International was held.

Most tournaments also featured on the 2007 Nordic Golf League.

Schedule
The following table lists official events during the 2007 season.

Order of Merit
The Order of Merit was based on prize money won during the season, calculated using a points-based system.

See also
2007 Danish Golf Tour
2007 Finnish Tour
2007 Swedish Golf Tour (women)

Notes

References

Swedish Golf Tour
Swedish Golf Tour